The Fortunes are an English harmony beat group. Formed in Birmingham, the Fortunes first came to prominence and international acclaim in 1965, when "You've Got Your Troubles" broke into the US, Canadian, and UK Top 10s. Afterwards, they had a succession of hits including "Here It Comes Again" and "Here Comes That Rainy Day Feeling Again"; continuing into the 1970s with more globally successful releases such as "Storm in a Teacup" and "Freedom Come, Freedom Go".

In 1966, their manager, Reginald Calvert, was shot dead in a dispute over pirate radio stations.

Biography
The Fortunes (Rod Allen, Glen Dale, Barry Pritchard as vocalists, Chris Capaldi as piano player, Gary Fletcher as drummer and Tony Britnell as saxophone player) were formed in 1961 and were resident at Clifton Hall in Rugby, Warwickshire where many 60s rockstars formed their career. The three vocalists had been the Merrie Men backing Robbie Hood (A.K.A Mike West, previously co-singer with Fred Heath in Johnny Kidd & The Pirates). The Fortunes were originally backed by an instrumental group known as the Cliftones, and the band placed an instrumental track on a compilation album, Brumbeat, issued by the local Dial record label. "Cygnet Twitch" was a working of Tchaikovsky's "Swan Lake", and they subsequently signed to British Decca in 1963. Their first single, "Summertime, Summertime", was credited to the Fortunes and the Cliftones. However, the vocalists picked up guitars, jettisoned the Cliftones, and added Andy Brown on drums, and Dave Carr on keyboards. The follow-up disc "Caroline", co-written by the singer-songwriter and future Ivy League member Perry Ford and songwriter Tony Hiller, is still in use as the signature tune for the pirate radio station, Radio Caroline.

The group's next two singles, Gordon Mills's co-composition "I Like the Look of You" and a revival of "Look Homeward Angel" — like the initial brace of releases overseen by the American record producer Shel Talmy — also failed to chart. Their fifth release, the Roger Greenaway/Roger Cook number, "You've Got Your Troubles" (1965), reached Number 2 in the UK Singles Chart and was a worldwide hit, including reaching Number 1 in Canada and the American Top 10. Their next two singles were "Here It Comes Again", a UK Number 4, and "This Golden Ring" a UK Number 14. These sold well, but each less than the previous release. When Glen Dale left in the summer of 1966 he was replaced by Shel McCrae. Three more singles ("You Gave Me Somebody to Love", "Is It Really Worth Your While?" and "Our Love has Gone") all failed to chart.

At this point in 1967, the Fortunes left Decca for United Artists. They reunited with Talmy for their next release, "The Idol", a song they had written themselves, and although it did get some airplay in the UK, it did not become a hit. Around this time they released a fine version of 'Seasons in the Sun' which also failed to chart.

The Fortunes also recorded an advertisement for Coca-Cola in the United States. Their first recording in 1967 was a version of the theme tune, "Things Go Better with Coke", but they are most remembered for introducing the 1969 new slogan recording, used as the main theme for Coca-Cola on both radio and television commercials — "It's The Real Thing".

In 1968, they tried covering The Move's hit "Fire Brigade" for the US market, but with little airplay or sales. In 1970, they recorded an album for the US World Pacific record label, and then signed with Capitol in both the UK and US in 1971.

Then followed a steady succession of singles, some of which were hits outside of the UK and US. It was during this period they had worldwide hits with "Here Comes That Rainy Day Feeling Again" and "Freedom Come, Freedom Go" in 1971, along with "Storm in a Teacup" in 1972.

Later work
Founding member and lead vocalist Allen continued fronting an ever changing version of the Fortunes from 1963 up to his death in 2008.

In 1983 and 1984 respectively, Michael Smitham and Paul Hooper joined Barry Pritchard and Rod Allen in the Fortunes. This line up of the Fortunes were awarded a gold disc in 1987 for over 100,000 sales of their All The Hits and More album.

In 1991, Glen Dale, whilst living in Tenerife, reformed the group as Glen Dale's Fortunes alongside Martin Cox (guitar) (who has gone on to be one of the world's top Elton John tributes).

In March 1995, Bob Jackson was added to the Fortunes' ranks, after founder member Barry Pritchard left through illness. Jackson, a former member of the group Badfinger, paid homage to his former bandmate on stage, with a version of the Badfinger penned song "Without You". Jackson left for a year to follow other obligations and Geoff Turton, who was originally a member of the Rockin' Berries, stood in for him. Barry Pritchard died from a heart attack on 11 January 1999 in Swindon, Wiltshire, UK.

On 10 January 2008, Rod Allen died after suffering for two months from liver cancer. The remaining members of the band said they would continue touring and recruited the Dakotas lead singer Eddie Mooney. During 2008, the band regrouped, recorded a new album Play On, and appeared in Las Vegas, the Netherlands and Belgium as well as the UK. They toured Canada, the Netherlands, and Sweden, in addition to the UK during 2009. The band had a busy schedule in the UK, Netherlands, Germany, and Italy during 2010 and 2011, appearing in Belgium at the Vostertfeesten Festival in August 2010. Drummer Paul Hooper left the band in early 2010 and was replaced by Glenn Taylor, formerly of Marmalade. The band then released a new studio album, Another Road.

The keyboard player in the original line-up, David Carr, lived and worked in Hollywood, California, doing session work, frequently working with The Ventures and also Kim Fowley. Carr died on 12 July 2011 from a heart attack.

Since 2011, the Fortunes have continued to appear on various 1960s theatre package shows with other artists of the era. Additionally, they have appeared in their own Past and Present theatre show and in 2015 released the accompanying Past and Present live album. In 2018 the Fortunes successfully toured Australia and keyboard player Bob Jackson retired later in the year due to ill health. He was replaced by ex Merseybeats and Tornados keyboard player and vocalist Chris Hutchison. The band continues to feature on 1960s theatre shows such as "Sensational 60s" and "Sixties Gold" as well as cruise appearances.

Glen Dale died at a hospice care facility after a battle with heart disease, on 13 January 2019, at age 79.  Singer Shel Macrae died in 2022 at the age of 77.

Streaming hits in 2021
In 2021 the Fortunes had two hit singles on the Amazon, Spotify and iTunes download charts with "Never Too Far" (Smitham/Mooney) and "One Special Moment" (Smitham) the band's first chart entries since 1972. The band resumed a UK theatre tour as part of the Sensational 60s Experience package in October 2021 and released an album "Special Moments" in December 2021. The Fortunes signed to US label "Creative & Dreams" in 2022, releasing the single "Hello My Friend" (Smitham) a hit on the Heritage Chart, hosted by Mike Read.

Members
Original members
 Rod Allen (born Rodney Bainbridge, 31 March 1944, Leicester – 10 January 2008, Eastern Green, Coventry) – lead vocals, bass (1963–2008)
 Barry Pritchard (born Barry Arthur Pritchard, 3 April 1944, Birmingham – 11 January 1999, Swindon, Wiltshire) – lead guitar, vocals (1963–1995)
 Andy Brown (born Andrew Brown, 7 January 1946, Birmingham) – drums (1963–1977)
 Glen Dale (born Richard Garforth, 1939, Deal, Kent – 13 January 2019, Chesterfield, Derbyshire) – rhythm guitar (1963–1966) 
 David Carr (born 4 August 1943, Leyton, London – 12 July 2011) – keyboards (1963–1968)

Current members
 Michael Smitham (born 29 July 1951, Nuneaton) – guitars, vocals (1983–present)
 Eddie Mooney (born 6 August 1957, Stoke-on-Trent) – lead vocals, bass (2007–present)
 Glenn Taylor (born 15 February 1952, Leicester) – drums (2010–present)
 Chris Hutchison (born 4 April 1963, Sheffield) – keyboards, vocals (2018–present)

Former members
 Bob Jackson – keyboards, vocals (1995–2018)
 Geoff Turton – keyboards, vocals (2013)
 Shel Macrae (born Andrew Raeburn Semple, 8 March 1943, Burnbank, Scotland, died 22 November 2022)– lead vocals, rhythm guitar (1966–1977)
 George McAllister (born 6 December 1945) vocals, piano, mellotron 1970 – 1974 
 John Trickett (born Birmingham) – drums (1977–1984)
 John Davey (born 13 September 1955, Watford) – vocals (1977–1983)
 Ricky Persell (born 19 October 1954, Ruislip) – guitars, vocals (1977–1980)
 Paul Hooper (born 20 August 1948, Wolverhampton) – drums (1984–2010)

Discography

See also
List of Capitol Records artists
List of NME covers
List of performers on Top of the Pops
List of artists under the Decca Records label
Arts in Birmingham

References

External links
 
 The official Shel Macrae website
 
 The Fortunes biography in Oldies.com
 The Fortunes in 45-rpm.org.uk
 The Fortunes at 45cat.com
 

Beat groups
British Invasion artists
English pop music groups
Musical groups from Birmingham, West Midlands
Musical groups established in 1963
Cub Records artists
Top Rank Records artists
Decca Records artists
Capitol Records artists
United Artists Records artists
1963 establishments in England